John Ridley IV (born 1965) is an American screenwriter, television director, novelist, and showrunner, known for 12 Years a Slave, for which he won an Academy Award for Best Adapted Screenplay. He is also the creator and showrunner of the anthology series American Crime. In 2017 he directed the documentary film Let It Fall: Los Angeles 1982–1992.

Early life
Ridley was born in Milwaukee, Wisconsin, and was raised from the age of seven in Mequon, Wisconsin, with an ophthalmologist father, John Ridley, III, and a mother, Terry Ridley, who was a special education teacher for Milwaukee Public Schools. He has two sisters and is the middle sibling.

Ridley graduated from Homestead High School in Mequon, Wisconsin in 1982. He enrolled in Indiana University but transferred to New York University. There, he graduated with a bachelor's degree in East Asian languages. The subject wasn't applicable to his career, but it sparked his intellectual interests. Ridley is Christian.

Career
Following college, Ridley spent a year living and traveling in Japan. Then, he returned to New York and began performing standup comedy in New York City, and he made appearances on Late Night with David Letterman and The Tonight Show Starring Johnny Carson. Moving to Los Angeles in 1990, he began writing for such television sitcoms as Martin, The Fresh Prince of Bel-Air, and The John Larroquette Show.
After both writing and directing his film debut, the 1997 crime thriller Cold Around the Heart, he and Oliver Stone co-adapted Ridley's first novel, Stray Dogs (still unpublished when Stone bought the rights) into the 1997 Stone-directed film U Turn, which was released slightly earlier than Cold Around the Heart. Ridley went on to write the novels Love Is a Racket and Everybody Smokes in Hell. His novel Spoils of War was adapted into the 1999 David O. Russell-directed Three Kings. Ridley's original script was rewritten by Russell and Ridley, with Ridley receiving a "story by" credit negotiated among himself, Russell, and the releasing studio, Warner Bros. Ridley then became a writer and a supervising producer on the NBC crime drama Third Watch. His other novels are The Drift, Those Who Walk in Darkness, and A Conversation with the Mann. He also wrote the graphic novel The American Way. 

From 2000 to 2010, he was a commentator and blogger for NPR. His blog was Visible Man, a play on Ralph Ellison's Invisible Man. In 2003, Ridley inked a one-year overall deal with Universal Network Television.

His work as screenwriter also includes 12 Years a Slave, Red Tails, and Undercover Brother. His script for 12 Years a Slave won the Academy Award for Best Adapted Screenplay, making Ridley the second African American to win the award, after Geoffrey S. Fletcher (for Precious, based on the novel Push by Sapphire).

In April 2015, Ridley was developing an ABC television series involving an existing Marvel Comics character. However, by December 2019, the project was cancelled due to Marvel Television folding into Marvel Studios.

On April 16, 2018, it was announced that Ridley would direct and write an adaptation of his graphic novel The American Way produced by Blumhouse Productions.

On June 4, 2018, it was announced that Ridley would direct a feature film adaptation of the Robert Silverberg short story, Needle in a Timestack produced by Bron Studios. The film featured performances from Leslie Odom Jr., Freida Pinto, Cynthia Erivo, and Orlando Bloom.

In 2021, Ridley began writing a number of series for DC Comics. The series include a new Batman series 'The Next Batman' as part of the company's line-wide event 'Future State', and a 5-issue series 'The Other History of the DC Universe' a text-based story about the history of the non-white, non-American DC heroes such as Black Lightning and Katana.

In May 2021, Marvel Comics announced that Ridley will write Black Panther comics.

Controversy 
In December 2007, during the Writers Guild of America strike against the major production studios, Ridley opted for WGA membership as a dues-paying non-member, or "fi-core," making him eligible to submit scripts to the studios while the strike was ongoing. In an op-ed published in the Los Angeles Times, Ridley expressed his frustration at the direction the strike had taken and the WGA's crushing of internal dissent: "After 15 years of being told shut up, sit down and be part of the groupthink, I decided I did not belong in the guild. The guild has a way to option out. I took the option." Ridley's screenplay for 12 Years a Slave was thus ineligible for a Writers Guild of America Award.

Personal life
Ridley is married to wife Gayle, a former script supervisor. They have two children.

Filmography

Film

Television

Acting credits

Awards and nominations

Works and publications

Novels
 Ridley, John. Stray Dogs. New York: Ballantine Books, 1997. 
 Ridley, John. Love Is a Racket: A Novel. New York: Knopf, 1998. 
 Ridley, John. Everybody Smokes in Hell. New York: Alfred A. Knopf, 1999. 
 Ridley, John. A Conversation with the Mann: A Novel. New York: Warner Books, 2002. 
 Ridley, John. The Drift. New York: Knopf, 2002. 
 Ridley, John. Those Who Walk in Darkness New York: Warner Books, 2003. 
 Ridley, John, and Patricia R. Floyd. What Fire Cannot Burn. Prince Frederick, MD: Recorded Books, 2011, 2007.

Graphic novels
 Ridley, John, and Ben Oliver. The Authority: Human on the Inside. La Jolla, CA: WildStorm Productions, 2004. 978-1-401-20070-1
 Ridley, John. The Razor's Edge: Warblade #1-5. DC Comics. 2005.
 Ridley, John, Georges Jeanty, and Karl C. Story. The American Way. La Jolla, Calif: WildStorm/DC Comics, 2007. 
 Ridley, John, Giuseppe Camuncoli, Andrea Cucchi, and José Villarrubia. The Other History of the DC Universe. DC Comics, 2021. ISBN 978-1-779-51197-3

Stage plays
 Ridley, John. Ten Thousand Years. 2005 (world premiere).

Essays
 Ridley, John. "The Manifesto of Ascendancy for the Modern American Nigger." Esquire, December 2006, Volume 146, Issue 6.

References

Further reading 
 Gennusa, Chris R. "John Ridley: Burnt Noir." Creative Screenwriting. Winter 1997, v. 4 n.4, pp. 33–38

External links
 Archived pages of defunct official site: December 1, 2006 – March 1, 2007, January 8 – April 12, 2007, March 1 – August 28, 2007 (final archived page other than contact page).
 
 John Ridley at DC Comics.

1965 births
Living people
20th-century African-American writers
20th-century American male writers
20th-century American novelists
20th-century American screenwriters
21st-century African-American writers
21st-century American male writers
21st-century American novelists
21st-century American screenwriters
African-American comics creators
African-American film directors
African-American male writers
African-American novelists
African-American screenwriters
African-American television directors
American comics writers
American crime fiction writers
American documentary film directors
American male novelists
American male screenwriters
American male television writers
American science fiction writers
American television directors
American television writers
Best Adapted Screenplay Academy Award winners
Film directors from Wisconsin
Filmmakers from Milwaukee
Independent Spirit Award winners
Marvel Comics people
Marvel Comics writers
DC Comics people
Novelists from Wisconsin
People from Mequon, Wisconsin
Screenwriters from Wisconsin
Showrunners
Writers from Milwaukee